René Joachim Henri Dutrochet (14 November 1776 – 4 February 1847) was a French physician, botanist and physiologist. He is best known for his investigation into osmosis.

Early career
Dutrochet was born on Néons to a noble family, soon ruined in the French Revolution. In 1799 he entered the military marine at Rochefort, but soon left it to join the Vendean army. He then left it to tend to his family's manor in Touraine. There, he was a keen addition to the scientific nation.

Contributions
His scientific publications were numerous, and covered a wide field, but his most noteworthy work was embryological. His Recherches sur l'accroissement et la reproduction des végétaux, published in the Mémoires du museum d'histoire naturelle for 1821, procured him in that year the French Academy's prize for experimental physiology. In 1837 appeared his Mémoires pour servir a l'histoire anatomique et physiologique des végétaux et des animaux, a collection of all his more important biological papers.

He investigated and described osmosis, respiration, embryology, and the effect of light on plants. He has been given credit for discovering cell biology and cells in plants and the actual discovery of the process of osmosis. His early researches into the voice introduced the first modern concept of vocal cord movement.

The Mauritian plant genus Trochetia was named in his honour.

Works

 New Theory of the Voice (1800)
 New Theory of Harmony (1810)
 Researches in the growth and reproduction of plants (1821)
 Research in Osteogenesis (bone production) (1822)
 Research in the anatomy of animals and plants (1824)
 Research in an agent's immediate vital movement (1826)
 Research in Endosmosis and Exosmosis (1828)
 Research in the development of the egg and the fetus
 Research in Radial development in plants and the ascent of Sap.
 Contributions to understanding anatomy and physiology of plants and animals (1837)
 Research in the elliptical force (1842–43)
 Contributions to the modern cell theory

See also
Cell theory

References

External links
Henri Dutrochet (1776-1847): an unheralded discoverer of the cell
 "Nouvelles observations sur l'endosmose et l'exosmose" (1827), online and analyzed on BibNum  [click 'à télécharger' for English analysis]

1776 births
1847 deaths
Members of the French Academy of Sciences
19th-century French physicians
18th-century French physicians
French physiologists